Bárdudvarnok is a village in Somogy county, Hungary. It is located in the Zselic. The village of Szenna is very close to Bárdudvarnok. From the city of Kaposvár there are two ways to go to Bárdudvarnok.

Tourism, sports 
Tourists can find a Scandinavian-style wooden Benedictine monastery, Goszthonyi Halls and János Somogyi's private arboretum here. There are some sports opportunities including an Archery Ranch here.

Honorary citizen of Bárdudvarnok 
Róbert Cey-Bert, a native of Bárdudvarnok, was awarded the Knight's Cross of the Hungarian Order of Merit, the Pro Comitatu Somogy Award and many other honours and awards, as well as the title of Honorary Citizen of Bárdudvarnok.

External links 
 Street map (Hungarian)

References 

Populated places in Somogy County